Northern Township is one of twelve townships in Franklin County, Illinois, USA.  As of the 2010 census, its population was 476 and it contained 195 housing units.

Geography

Cities, towns, villages
 Macedonia (west half)

Unincorporated towns
 Diana
 Frisco
 Taylor Hill
(This list is based on USGS data and may include former settlements.)

Cemeteries
The township contains these five cemeteries: Gilgal, Jacksonville, Macedonia, Middle Fork, Smith and Walnut Grove.

Major highways
  Illinois Route 14

Demographics

School districts
 Hamilton County Community Unit School District 10

Political districts
 Illinois' 12th congressional district
 State House District 117
 State Senate District 59

References
 
 United States Census Bureau 2007 TIGER/Line Shapefiles
 United States National Atlas

External links
 City-Data.com
 Illinois State Archives

Townships in Franklin County, Illinois
Townships in Illinois